Hypatopa montivaga is a moth in the family Blastobasidae. It was described by Hiroshi Inoue et al. in 1982. It is found in Japan.

References

Hypatopa
Moths described in 1982